Masquerade is a 2021 American thriller film, written and directed by Shane Dax Taylor. It stars Bella Thorne, Alyvia Alyn Lind, Austin Nichols, Mircea Monroe and Skyler Samuels. It was released on July 30, 2021, by Shout! Factory.

Premise
A young girl struggles to survive a home invasion after burglars break into her home to steal her family's artwork.

Cast
Bella Thorne as Rose
Alyvia Alyn Lind as Casey
Austin Nichols as Daniel
Mircea Monroe as Olivia
Ana Rodas as Nanny
Skyler Samuels as Woman

Production
In December 2019, it was announced Bella Thorne, Alyvia Alyn Lind, Austin Nichols, Mircea Monroe and Skyler Samuels had joined the cast of the film, with Shane Dax Taylor directing from a screenplay he wrote, with XYZ Films set to produce the film.

Principal photography began in December 2019.

Release
In March 2021, Shout! Factory acquired distribution rights to the film. It was released on July 30, 2021.

Reception
The review aggregator website Rotten Tomatoes surveyed  and, categorizing the reviews as positive or negative, assessed 2 as positive and 13 as negative for a 13% rating. Among the reviews, it determined an average rating of 3.40 out of 10.

References

External links

2021 thriller films
American thriller films
Home invasions in film
2020s English-language films
2020s American films